Zvi Laron (born February 6, 1927) is an Israeli paediatric endocrinologist. Born in Cernăuţi, Romania, Laron is a professor emeritus at Tel Aviv University.
In 1966, he described the type of dwarfism later called Laron syndrome. His research opened the way to the treatment of many cases of growth hormone disorders. He was the first to introduce the multidisciplinary treatment for juvenile diabetes.

Biography

Family background and childhood
Laron was born on February 7, 1927, to a Jewish family in the Bukovinian city of Cernăuţi (Chernivtsi), then in Romania (now in Ukraine). At the age of 6, he moved with his family to another Bukovinian town, Rădăuți. Following the June 1941 invasion of the USSR by Nazi Germany, Romania allied itself with Nazi Germany and regained Northern Bukovina (which had been annexed by the USSR in 1940), the 14-year-old child and his family were deported to the concentration camps of Transnistria. There he had the chance to survive as a worker in a factory, which was founded in Mogilev by his uncle, Siegfried Sami Jagendorf (1885–1970), in order to save as many Jewish deportees as possible. Accordingly, Laron became a licensed iron turner.

Studies in Romania and Israel
After the end of the war, Laron was able to complete his high school studies and in 1945 he commenced his studies in medicine at the newly founded Medical School (Institutul medico-farmaceutic) in the town of Timișoara, in western Romania.
He was an active member of the Zionist students movement "Hasmonea", and left Romania in 1947 in order to emigrate illegally to Eretz Israel, then Mandatory Palestine. The ship of Jewish refugees from Eastern Europe, "Pan York" (nicknamed in Hebrew "Kibbutz Galuyot") was captured in the Mediterranean Sea by the British navy and its passengers, including Laron, were deported to internment camps in Cyprus. After the proclamation of the State of Israel in May 1948, Laron was freed and allowed to enter the country. After his arrival, he joined the army and served in the  "Dajani" and Tel Hashomer's hospitals. In 1952, he graduated with MD from the Hadassah Hospital Hebrew University Medical School, Jerusalem. He then did his internship at Rambam Hospital in Haifa. During 1954–1957, he was a research and clinical fellow in paediatrics at the Massachusetts General Hospital and Harvard Medical School Boston, and at the Children's Hospital in Pittsburgh, while his fellowships was focalized especially on childhood endocrinology.

Work as endocrinologist in Israel
At the end of 1957, Laron returned to Israel and joined André de Vries in founding the pediatric endocrinological clinic and research in Israel. In 1958 he was the founder of the Institute for Pediatric and Adolescent Endocrinology at the Beilinson Medical Center in Petah Tikva, affiliated to Tel Aviv University, and led it until 1992.
Laron was one of the first members of the teaching staff of the School of Medicine at Tel Aviv University and had a leading role in elaborating the pediatric teaching program at that institution.
From 1983 to 1997 Laron was Incumbent of the Irene and Nicholas Marsh Chair in Endocrinology and Juvenile Diabetes, Sackler Faculty of Medicine, Tel Aviv University.
He also founded the All-Country Center for Juvenile Diabetes and an endocrinological laboratory aimed to develop new methods of detecting hormones in blood. This laboratory worked in the frame of the Felsenstein Institute of Research.

Since 1998 Laron has been Professor Emeritus of Pediatric Endocrinology, Tel Aviv University and Director of Endocrinology and Diabetes Research Unit, Schneider Children's Medical Center of Israel.

In 1966, together with A. Pertzelan and S. Mannheimer, he described a new type of dwarfism (subsequently named "Laron Syndrome") of  growth hormone resistance characterized by high levels of GH in serum, and low IGF-I levels. The Institute of Pediatric Endocrinology was among the first medical centers to produce and use in therapy the GH and IGF hormones and gonadotropin analogues. Laron was among the founders of the International Society for Pediatric and Adolescent Diabetes, (ISPAD). He founded and served as Editor in Chief of the European Society of Pediatric Endorinology (ESPE) and the Growth Hormone Research Society (GRS) of the scientific journals Journal of Pediatric Endocrinology and Metabolism, Pediatric and Adolescent Endocrinology and Pediatric Endocrinology Reviews.

Awards 
Zvi Laron has received many honours, among them:
 1982 Paul Langerhans Medal and Memorial Lecture, German Diabetes Association
 1987 Member, German National Academy of Sciences Leopoldina
 1993 Award of Merit conferred by ISPAD (International Society for Pediatric and Adolescent Diabetology)
 1995 Honorary Member of the Medical and Scientific Academy of Romania
 1998 Doctor Honoris Causa conferred by the University of Medicine and Pharmacy "Iuliu Hatieganu", Cluj-Napoca, Romania
 1998 Centennial Medal, Italian Pediatric Society
 1999 Andrea Prader Prize – ESPE (European Society of Pediatric Endocrinology)
 2000 Doctor Honoris Causa, University of Medicine and Pharmacy, Timișoara, Romania
 2000 Doctor Honoris Causa, University of Novara, Italy
 2001 Recipient of The Endocrine Society (USA) Clinical Investigator Award
 2002 Nominated Honorary President of the Hellenic Society for the Study and Applications of Growth Hormone, Greece
 2003  International Society for Pediatric and Adolescent Diabetes (ISPAD)Prize for achievements in Science, Education and Advocacy for Childhood Diabetes
 2008 Knight, First Class of the Order of the White Rose of Finland awarded by the President of the State of Finland
 2009 Israel Prize awarded by the State of Israel in recognition for contributions in the field of pediatric endocrinology and diabetes
 2012 Recipient of the Human Growth Foundation (USA) Award, Houston, Texas
2014  Israel Society of Endocrinology (IES) Award in recognition of contributions to Endocrinology in Israel
2015  American College of Endocrinology International Endocrinology Award
2015  Doctor Honoris Causa in Science, University of San Francisco Quito, Ecuador 
2016  Growth Hormone Research Society Honorary Award
2017  Honorary Doctorate, Aristotle University of Thessaloniki, Greece
2017  Honorary Member, Ecuadorian Pediatric Society, Ecuador

Selective papers of special interest

 Laron Z, Pertzelan A, Mannheimer S. Genetic pituitary dwarfism with high serum concentration of growth hormone—a new inborn error of metabolism? Israel journal of medical sciences. 1966;2:152-5
 Laron Z, Pertzelan A, Karp M, Kowadlo-Silbergeld A, Daughaday WH. Administration of growth hormone to patients with familial dwarfism with high plasma immunoreactivity growth hormone: measurement of sulfation factor, metabolic and linear growth responses. The Journal of clinical endocrinology and metabolism. 1971;33:332-42
 Laron Z, Galatzer A, Amir S, Gil R, Karp M, Mimouni M. A multidisciplinary, comprehensive, ambulatory treatment scheme for diabetes mellitus in children. Diabetes care. 1979;2:342-8
 Eshet R, Laron Z, Pertzelan A, Arnon R, Dintzman M. Defect of human growth hormone receptors in the liver of two patients with Laron-type dwarfism. Israel journal of medical sciences. 1984;20:8-11
 Godowski PJ, Leung DW, Meacham LR, Galgani JP, Hellmiss R, Keret R, et al. Characterization of the human growth hormone receptor gene and demonstration of a partial gene deletion in two patients with Laron-type dwarfism. Proceedings of the National Academy of Sciences of the United States of America. 1989;86:8083-7
 Gil-Ad I, Leibowitch N, Josefsberg Z, Wasserman M, Laron Z. Effect of oral clonidine, insulin-induced hypoglycemia and exercise on plasma GHRH levels in short-stature children. Acta endocrinologica. 1990;122:89-95
 Laron Z. Laron syndrome (primary growth hormone resistance or insensitivity): the personal experience 1958–2003. The Journal of clinical endocrinology and metabolism. 2004;89:1031-44
 Weinstein D, Simon M, Yehezkel E, Laron Z, Werner H. Insulin analogues display IGF-I-like mitogenic and anti-apoptotic activities in cultured cancer cells. Diabetes/metabolism research and reviews. 2009;25:41-9
 Steuerman R, Shevah O, Laron Z. Congenital IGF1 deficiency tends to confer protection against post-natal development of malignancies. European journal of endocrinology. 2011;164:485-9
 Laron Z, Hampe CS, Shulman LM. The urgent need to prevent type 1 autoimmune childhood diabetes. Pediatric endocrinology reviews : PER. 2015;12:266-8 
 Laron Z, Laron-Kenet T, Klinger G. For Debate: Growth Hormone Treatment of Infants Born Small for Gestational Age should be Started at or before the First      Year of Age. Pediatric endocrinology reviews : PER. 2016;14:105-8

Books authored
Thomas J. Mérimée, Zvi Laron

Growth Hormone, IGF-I and Growth: New Views of Old Concepts

Freund Publishing House, London, UK, 1996

   
Zvi Laron, John Kopchick

Laron Syndrome – From Man to Mouse

Lessons from Clinical and Experimental Experience

Springer, Heidelberg, 2011

Books edited 
Zvi Laron

Habilitation and Rehabilitation of Juvenile Diabetics: Proceedings

Williams and Wilkins company, 1970

Zvi Laron

The Adipose Child

S. Kager Pub, Basel, 1976

Zvi Laron, Avinoam Galatzer

Psychological Aspects of Diabetes in children and Adolescents

S.Karger Pub, Basel, 1983

Laron Z, Rogol AD

Hormones and Sport

Raven Press, New York, 1989

Z Laron, M Karp

Genetic and Environmental Risk Factors for Type 1 Diabetes (IDDM) Including a Discussion on the Autoimmune Basis

Freund Publishing House Ltd, London, UK, 1992

Zvi Laron, Otfrid Butenandt

Growth Hormone Replacement therapy in Adults: Pros and Cons. 1st Edition.

Feund Publishing House Ltd, London, UK, 1993

Laron Z, Parks JS

Lessons from Laron Syndrome (Ls) 1966–1992. A Model of GH and iGF-1 Action and Interaction. Pediatric and Adolescent Endocrinology, Volume 24

S. Karger Pub, Basel, 1993

Zvi Laron, S. Mastragostino, C. Romano

Limb Lengthening for Whom, When & How?

Freund Publishing House Ltd, Londo, UK, 1995

References

External links
 
"Perpetuum mobile, homage article about Zvi Laron in Journal of Pediatric Endocrinology and Metabolism 22 ,387–388, 2009 Freund Publ. London 
 
The Endocrine Society Oral History Collection, The Clark Sawin Library, USA, June 23, 2012

See also 
List of Israel Prize recipients

Israel Prize in medicine recipients
Harvard Medical School people
Academic staff of Tel Aviv University
Israeli people of Romanian-Jewish descent
Bukovina Jews
Romanian Jews
Romanian emigrants to Mandatory Palestine
People from Timișoara
1927 births
Living people
Israeli paediatric endocrinologists